Gabriel Mmole (1939 – 15 May 2019) was a Tanzanian Roman Catholic prelate. Born in Nangoo, Mmole was ordained to the priesthood in 1971. He was appointed Bishop of Mtwara in 1988 and served until Pope Francis accepted his resignation on 15 October 2015 and named  to succeed him.

Mmole died following a long illness on 15 May 2019 in Mtwara, at the age of 80.

References

1939 births
2019 deaths
20th-century Roman Catholic bishops in Tanzania
21st-century Roman Catholic bishops in Tanzania
Roman Catholic bishops of Mtwara